The 1998 Copa Libertadores final stages were played from 15 April to 26 August 1998 and consisted of the round of 16 (or second stage), quarter-finals, semi-finals and the finals. A total of 16 teams competed in the final stages to decide the champions of the 1998 Copa Libertadores.

The final stages had a one-month break between the quarter-finals and semi-finals due to the 1998 FIFA World Cup held from 10 June to 12 July 1998.

Qualified teams
The winners, runners-up and third placed teams of each of the five groups in the group stage advanced to the round of 16, alongside defending champions Cruzeiro, who received a directly bye to this round.

Seeding

In the final stages, the teams were seeded according to the pre-established numbering they received according to the final position they occupied in their respective group. Numbers 1, 5, 9, 13 and 17 correspond to each group winners; numbers 2, 6, 10, 14 and 18 to runners-up; and 3, 7, 11 15 and 19 to third placed teams.

Format

In the final stages, the 16 teams played a single-elimination tournament with the following rules:
 In the round of 16, quarter-finals, semi-finals and finals, each tie was played on a home-and-away two-legged basis. If tied on points after the two legs the goal difference would be applied. if still tied, extra time was not played, and a penalty shoot-out was used to determine the winners.
 In the event that the two Brazilian teams from the group stage qualify for the round of 16, the lower-seeded team between these two would face defending champion Cruzeiro in order to prevent three Brazilian teams from reaching the quarter-finals.
 If two teams from the same national association reached the quarter-finals, they had to face each other, and those teams that had to face them formed another tie under the same conditions.
 If one or more games are settled in the quarterfinals between clubs belonging to the same national association, the Match S1 would correspond to the pair including the lower-seeding team. The following matches would be determined according to the same criteria.
 In all cases in which the order of legs could not be determined, the lower-seeding team had to host the first leg. Defending champions Cruzeiro had to host the second leg in the round of 16.

The above criteria were established to ensure that the four semifinalists would be of different nationalities (Regulations Section III, Article 3).

Bracket
The original bracket for the final stages was determined as follows:

Per regulations, the original bracket had the following modifications:
 In the round of 16, Vasco da Gama and Alianza Lima swapped positions. Vasco da Gama had to faced Cruzeiro  in order to avoid three possible Brazilian teams in the quarter-finals.
 In quarter-finals, the two Brazilians teams and the two Argentine teams had to face each other, and the order of the ties was rearranged according to the regulations.

Round of 16
The first legs were played on 15, 22 and 23 April. and the second legs were played on 29 and 30 April and 2 and 7 May 1998.

|}

Match A

Cerro Porteño won 3–1 on aggregate and advanced to the quarter-finals (Match S3).

Match B

Grêmio won 5–1 on aggregate and advanced to the quarter-finals (Match S1).

Match C

Tied 0–0 on aggregate, Colón won on penalties and advanced to the quarter-finals (Match S2).

Match D

Bolivar won 3–1 on aggregate and advanced to the quarter-finals (Match S4).

Match E

River Plate won 2–1 on aggregate and advanced to the quarter-finals (Match S2).

Match F

Barcelona won 4–3 on aggregate and advanced to the quarter-finals (Match S4).

Match G

Tied 2–2 on aggregate, Peñarol won on penalties and advanced to the quarter-finals (Match S3).

Match H

Vasco da Gama won 2–1 on aggregate and advanced to the quarter-finals (Match S1).

Quarter-finals
The first legs were played on 3, 13 and 20 May. and the second legs were played on 6 and 27 May 1998.

|}

Match S1

Vasco da Gama won 2–1 on aggregate and advanced to the semi-finals (Match F1).

Match S2

River Plate won 5–2 on aggregate and advanced to the semi-finals (Match F1).

Match S3

Cerro Porteño won 3–2 on aggregate and advanced to the semi-finals (Match F2).

Match S4

Barcelona won 5–1 on aggregate and advanced to the semi-finals (Match F2).

Semi-finals
The first legs were played on 16 July. and the second legs were played on 22 July 1998.

{{TwoLegResult|Barcelona|ECU|2–2 |Cerro Porteño'|PAR|1–0|1–2}}
|}

Match F1Vasco da Gama won 2–1 on aggregate and advanced to the finals.Match F2Tied 2–2 on aggregate, Barcelona won 4–3 on penalties and advanced to the finals.Finals

The first leg was played on 12 August, and the second leg was played on 26 August 1998.Vasco da Gama won 4–1 on aggregate.''

References

External links
 Copa Libertadores de América 1998, at RSSSF.org

April 1998 sports events in South America

August 1998 sports events in South America